The 2012 IAAF Diamond League (also known as the 2012 Samsung Diamond League for sponsorship purposes) was the third edition of the Diamond League, an annual series of fourteen one-day track and field meetings.

The series began on 11 May in Doha, Qatar and ended on 7 September in Brussels, Belgium.

Meeting calendar

Results

Events not included in the Diamond League are marked in grey background in the below tables.

Men

Track

 In Eugene and Oslo, mile races are counted to the Diamond League standings for the 1500 metres.
 In Stockholm, 3000m race is counted to the Diamond League standings for the 5000m metres.

Field

Women

Track

 In Doha, 3000 m race is counted to the Diamond League standings for the 5000 metres.

Field

References

Results
Results Archive. IAAF Diamond League (archived). Retrieved on 2015-05-17.

External links
Official website

Diamond League
Diamond League